This is a list of English language words whose origin can be traced to the Spanish language as "Spanish loan words". Words typical of "Mock Spanish" used in the United States are listed separately.

A 
abaca via Spanish abacá from Tagalog abaká
abalone from Spanish , from Ohlone aluan or Rumsen awlun.adios from Spanish 'adiós' meaning "goodbye" < latin ad deus "to god" (short for "a Dios seas", "a Dios seades", literally, "may (you) be (commended) to God")
adobe From Egyptian via Arabic "Al-tub"
aficionado from past participle of aficionar, to inspire affection, from afición affection, from Latin affection-, affectio, from afficere .
albatross from alcatraz, see below.
Alcalde from alcalde, magistrate.
Alcatraz (meaning "gannet") from Arabic غطاس al-ġaţţās ("the diver")
alidade via French, Spanish alidada and Medieval Latin alhidade from Arabic العهدة al-idada, "the revolving radius"
alligator from el lagarto, "the lizard" < latín lacartus < lacertus.
alpaca via Spanish, from Aymara allpaqaaludel from Old French alutel, via Spanish and Medieval Latin from Arabic الأثال al-ʾuṯāl, "the sublimation vessel"
amigo from Spanish and/or Portuguese amigo, "friend"; from Latin amicus meaning "friend," derived from amare (to love).
amole Mexican Spanish from Nahautl amolli meaning "soap root."
amontillado from the village of Montilla "little mount", Province of Córdoba, Spain
ancho from Mexican Spanish (chile) ancho, "wide (chili)" < latin amplusanchovy from Spanish anchoa or more probably Portuguese anchova meaning "bluefish"; from Genoese or Corsican dialect; ultimately from Latin apua meaning "small fish" and Greek Αφυε aphye meaning "small fry" or from Basque anchuva meaning "dry"
Angeleno from American Spanish
Apache from Mexican Spanish from Yavapai epache meaning "people" or from Zuni apachu meaning "enemy"
armada "armed [fleet]" from the Spanish navy, La armada españolaarmadillo from armadillo, "little armored one"
arroyo from arroyo, "stream" < arrugiumavocado alteration of Spanish aguacate, from Nahuatl ahuacatl.
ayahuasca via Spanish from Quechua ayawaska meaning "soul vine."

 B 
banana from Spanish or Portuguese banana, probably from a Wolof word, or from Arabic بأننا “ba’ nana” fingers
bandolier from Spanish bandolero, meaning "band (for a weapon or other) that crosses from one shoulder to the opposite hip" and bandolero, loosely meaning "he who wears a bandolier"

barbeque from barbacoa, from Spanish, taken from Caribbean Taínos barbacu, cooking set-up with wood tray at a height over fire
barracuda from barracuda  May have come from  barraco, meaning overlapping tooth
barranca from Spanish barranca or barranco, ravinebarrio from Spanish barrio, "neighborhood", from Arabic بري barri, wild
bastinado from bastonada, from Spanish bastón, cane
bodega from Spanish and/or Portuguese bodega, meaning cellar < latin-greek aphothekam.
bodegón from bodegónbolero from Spanish bolerobonanza from bonanza meaning "prosperity" < latin bonantia < bonus "good".
bonito from Spanish bonito, meaning "beautiful" < latin bonus "good".
breeze from brisa "cold northeast wind" or from Frisian briesen - to blow (wind)
bronco from bronco meaning "coarse"
buckaroo from vaquero meaning "cowboy", ultimately from Latin "vaccarium" "cowboy" (vacca "cow").
burrito diminutive of burro, a dish originally from Northern Mexico, literally "little donkey"
burro from burro, "donkey" < latin burricus "small horse".

 C 
caballero from Spanish caballero meaning "knight/gentleman", from caballo, "horse", Celtic caballos "horse".
cabana from Spanish cabaña or Portuguese cabana < latin < capanna; both meaning "cabin"
cacique from Spanish, from Taíno cacike or Arawak kassequa, both meaning a chief
cafeteria from cafetería, "coffee store"
calaboose from Vulgar Latin calafodium "to dig a protected place" and Louisiana French calabouse, from Spanish calabozocaldera from Spanish caldera meaning "cauldron" from Latin caldaria, "cooking pot."
California place name first seen in print in 1510 Spanish novel 'Las sergas de Esplandián' by Garci Rodríguez de Montalvo
camarilla from camarilla, "small room" diminutive of cámara "room" < latin camara.
camino from camino a path or road, from Celtic cammanos "road".
cannibal from Spanish caníbal, alteration of caríbal, from Caribe
canoe from Spanish canoa,  from Haitian canaouacanyon from cañón with same meaning. Derived from caño, "a pipe, tube, gorge, tube;" ultimately from Latin canna meaning "reed."
carabao from Spanish from Visayan language kalabaw, from Malay language kerabau.caramba from Spanish, meaning "heck"; expression of dread, displeasure, or disapproval, euphemism for carajocarbonado from carbonada, from carbón meaning "coal"
cargo from the verb cargar meaning "to load"
Caribbean from Spanish Caribe, from name of Carib Indians of the region.
cassava from cazabe, from Taíno caçábicaudillo from caudillo, from Latin capitellium "head" meaning "leader"
cedilla from cedilla, archaic spelling zedilla (little z), "elsewhere"
chaparral from Spanish, chaparro loosely meaning small evergreen oak, from Basque txapar, "small, short"
chaps from Mexican Spanish chaparreras, leg protectors for riding through chaparral
chayote from Spanish, literally: "squash", from Nahuatl chayotl meaning "spiny squash"
chicha from Spanish chicha, from Kuna chichab, meaning "maize" or from Nahuatl chichiatl, "fermented water."
chicle from chicle "gum", from Nahuatl tzictli "squishy stuff" or Mayan tsicte.chile from Spanish chile, from Nahuatl chillichipotle from Spanish, smoked jalapeño, from Nahuatl chilpoctlichocolate from Spanish chocolate, from Nahuatl xocolatl meaning "hot water" or from a combination of the Mayan word chocol meaning "hot" and the Nahuatl word atl meaning "water."
Choctaw from the native name Chahta of unknown meaning but also said to come from Spanish chato (="flattened") because of the tribe's custom of flattening the heads of male infants.
chorizo from chorizo, "sausage"
churro from churro, "fritter"
cienega or cienaga from ciénaga, "swamp" < latin caenus "mud" and native suffix -aka, caénaka.
cigar from Spanish cigarro meaning "fag (UK), stogie, stogy", from Mayan sicar or sic, "tobacco"
cigarette from French cigarette "little weed", diminutive of French cigare "stogie", from Spanish cigarro meaning "fag (UK), stogie, stogy."
cilantro from Spanish cilantro < latin coriandrum, "coriander"
coca from Spanish, coca meaning "coke", from Quechua kukacockroach from Spanish cucarachacocoa or cacao from Spanish cacao, from Nahuatl cacáhuatlcojones from Spanish cojones < latin coleones meaning "balls, testicles", to denote courage
Colorado from Spanish colorado < latin coloratus, red or colored
comrade from French camarade meaning "friend", from Spanish camarada < latin camara "room", "pal, mate"
condor from Spanish, from Quechua kunturconquistador from conquistador meaning "conqueror", from conquista < latin conquisita, "conquest"
coquina from coquina, dim. form of "concha" meaning seashell; a sedimentary rock of NE Florida
cordillera from cordillera, "range" < cordel "cord".
corral from corral meaning "pen, yard" from Portuguese curral meaning "pen" of unknown; perhaps ultimately from Afrikaans kraal or from Vulgar Latin currale loosely meaning "enclosure for vehicles."
corrida a bullfight (literally: "raced")
coyote from Spanish coyote, from Nahuatl coyotlcowboy from Spanish vaquero, an individual who managed cattle while mounted on horseback, from  vaca, "cow", from Latin vacca 
creole from French créole, from Spanish criollo, from Portuguese crioulo, raised in the house
crimson from Old Spanish cremesín, via Medieval Latin cremesinus from Arabic قيرميزل qirmizI, from Persian قرمز qermez kermes; ultimately from Sanskrit कृमिज krmi-ja meaning "worm-made."
crusade blend of Middle French croisade and Spanish cruzada; both ultimately from Latin crux, crucis "cross"
cuadrilla from cuadrilla "group of people" diminutive of cuadro "square" < latin quadrus.
cumbia from Spanish cumbia, a popular dance (for couples) originating in Colombia.

 D 
daiquiri from Daiquiri, a port city in eastern Cuba
dengue from Spanish dengue meaning "fever", from Swahili dinga, "seizure"
derecho from Spanish derecho  meaning "straight" or "masculine of right side" < latin directum, a widespread and long-lived convection-induced straight-line windstorm
descamisado from Spanish descamisado, "without a shirt" < camisa "shirt" < celtic kamisia.
desperado from Spanish desesperado, desperate
doubloon from Spanish doblón : meaning "two-sided" for two-headed coin ("doble" is double in Spanish < latin duplex).

 E 
El Dorado from El Dorado, literally, "the golden one"
El Niño from El Niño de la Navidad, literally, "the Christmas child" due to the warming of Pacific waters seemed to warm around Christmas
embarcadero from embarcadero a boat dock, from barca "rowboat".
embargo from Spanish embargar, to "seize" or "impound" < latin imbarricare.
escabeche from escabeche, "pickle" < Arabic assukkabáǧ.
escopeteros from Spanish escopetero, "musketeer", from escopeta "shotgun" < italian schioppetto.

 F 
Federales from Federales, "federal police"
fiesta from the Spanish fiesta meaning "party" < latin festaFlamenco "Spanish genre of music and dance typical of the gypsies". From Dutch flaming "from Flanders" (in the past it was believed that the gypsies were of German origin)
Florida from La Florida, the flowery or plant-filled place or pascua florida, "flowery Easter."
flotilla diminutive of flota, "fleet"

 G 
galleon from Spanish "galeón" (a large sailing ship having three or more masts, from the 15th to 18th century)
gaucho from Mapuche "Argentine cowboy"
gracias from Latin expression gratias agere ("to give thanks")
gringo probably from griego ("Greek"), in reference to the language (cf. Greek to me), and originally referring to any type of foreigner  
guacamole via American Spanish from Nahuatl ahuaca-molli ("avocado sauce")
guerrilla from Spanish obsolete meaning "small war" or current meaning "fire-armed group" (raised out of unbalanced democracy) from guerra "war" < Gothic werra "war"

 H 
habanero from the Spanish for the name of the Cuban city of La Habana, which is known as Havana in English. Although it is not the place of origin, it was frequently traded there.
hacienda from Old Spanish facienda, "estate"
hackamore from Spanish jaquima, "halter."
hola Spanish greeting, equivalent to "hello"
Hispano From Spanish hispanic. Also came from Latin Hispania, the whole Iberian peninsula (Spain and Portugal) called by Romans.
hombre from Spanish hombre, "man" < medieval homre < latin hominishoosegow from Spanish juzgado, courthouse, from juzgar < latin iudicare "to judge"
hurricane from Spanish huracán, from Taíno hurákan; akin to Arawak kulakani, thunder

 I 
Inca via Spanish inca, from Quechua Inka, literally: "lord, king."
incommunicado from incomunicado, without communication (in the mountains, in the jail,...), "in solitary confinement."
iguana from Spanish iguana from Arawak iwana. J 
jade from Spanish piedra de ijada, "stone of flank."
jalapeño from Spanish, a type of spicy chilli named after Jalapa de Enríquez, a town in Mexico, and the capital of the state of Veracruz
jerky via Spanish charqui, from Quechua ch'arki, "dried flesh"
junta from Spanish junta literally "joint"; a board of joint administration; sometimes used to refer to military officers command in a coup d'état.  As an adjective, it means "together".

 K 
key from Spanish cayo, from Taíno cayo (this is English 'key'/'cay'/'quay' as in an island, reef or a linked series of them, not the 'key' with which one locks/unlocks doors)

 L 
La Niña "The little girl", complementary weather pattern to (q.v.) El Niño
lariat from la reata, meaning "the strap, rein, or rope" from reatar ("to tie again") from atar "to tie (up);" from Latin aparte, "to join."
lasso via American English from Spanish lazo meaning "tie; or rope" ultimately from Latin laqueum, "noose, snare."
Latino English short for the Spanish word latinoamericano, formed by latino "related to the Latin empire and language" and americano "from the Americas"
llama via Spanish llama, from Quechua llamaLlanos from Spanish llano "plain" < latin planus; vast tropical grassland plain situated to the east of the Andes in Colombia and Venezuela.
loco from loco, "mad" or "crazy"
Lolita from the diminutive for Lola, short for Dolores

 M 
macho from macho "male, brave" < latin masculus, the property of being overtly masculine.
majordomo via Spanish mayordomo or Italian maggiordomo (both meaning "butler") from Latin maior domus meaning "mayor of the place."
mano from mano, "hand". Stone handtool
manzanilla from Spanish manzanilla, a natural tea for some superficial pains. The word is diminutive of manzana "apple"
marijuana from Spanish marihuana meaning cannabis.
maroon from the Spanish cimarrón, which was derived from an Arawakan root
matador from matador meaning "killer" from matar ("to kill") probably from Arabic مات mata meaning "he died", also possibly cognate with Persian مردن mordan, "to die" as well as English "murder." Another theory is that the word "matador" is derived from a combination of the Vulgar Latin mattāre, from Late Latin mactare (to slaughter, kill) and the Latin -tor (which is cognate with Greek τορ -tōr and Sanskrit तर -tar-.)
merengue a type of music and dance originating in the Dominican Republic
mesa from mesa, table < latin mensa. The corresponding Spanish word to a flat top mountain is mesetamescal from Spanish mezcal, from Nahuatl mexcallimesquite from Mexican Spanish mezquite, from Nahuatl mizquitlmestizo from mestizo "racially mixed" < latin mixticius "mixed" or "mongrel", in Spanish, refers to a person of mixed European and Native American descent.
mojito dim. formed from "mojado" (wet or dripping) probably referring to the mint leaves in the well known Cuban drink
mole also from Spanish as Guacamole, from Nahuatl molle or molli ("sauce")
Montana from montaña, a mountain
mosquito from mosquito, literally "little fly" < mosca "fly" < latin musca.
mulatto from Spanish or Portuguese mulato meaning "octoroon, sambo" from mulo "mule" > "hybrid". in Spanish, refers to a person of mixed European-African descent.
mustang from mustango, mestengo, mestencoor mesteño, "without known master or owner" (archaic)
mustee from mestizo, "racially mixed."or "mongrel"

 N 
nacho from Nacho, a nickname for the given name Ignacio, inventor of the snack
nada from "nada" meaning " nothing."
Negro from Spanish, Portuguese, or Italian negro, "black", from Latin nigrum (nom. niger) and Greek νέγρος négros, both meaning "black.". In Spanish it might be derogatory (depending on intonation and facial expression on some Latin countries).
Nevada from Nevada ("snowy") after the Sierra Nevada ("snowy mountains")
nostromo from nuestro amo, "our master".

 O 
olé an interjection, an expression of approval or triumph, similar to the Italian bravo (capable), by spectators of bull fights or football (soccer) matches
oregano from orégano, "marjoram"

 P 
pachuco from pachuco, "fancy-dresser." or "unsuitable or bad-looking attire"
paella from Spanish paella, from Valencian paella "pan" and the dish name. Originated in Latin patella, also meaning "pan."
palmetto from palmito, "palm heart, little palm", diminutive form of the word for palm.
pampa via Spanish, from Quechua pampa, plainpapaya from papaya, akin to Arawak papáiapáramo from Spanish  páramo (moorland)
patio from patio, inner courtyard, "an open paved area adjacent to a home"
peccadillo from pecadillo, "small sin"
peccary from Spanish pecarí, from Carib pakira or paquira.peon from Spanish peón ("laborer")
peyote from Spanish, from Nahuatl peyotl ("caterpillar")
Philippines via Spanish Filipinas from Latin Philippinae, "islands of king Philip II of Spain"; ultimately from Greek Φιλιππίναι Philippinai from the Greek phrase Φίλος ίππος Νησιά Fílos Íppos Ni̱sí, "Islands of the Horse Friend."
piccadill from picadillo, "hash"
pimento or pimiento from pimiento, "pepper."
piña colada from Spanish piña (pineapple), and colada, which means strained, from the Spanish verb colar ("to strain")
piñata from piñata ("jug, pot") from Latin pinea, "pine cone." or "birthday batting-pony game for kids"
piñon or pinyon from piñón, "pine"
pinta from pinta, "he/she/it paints"; also archaic Spanish for pintada, "painted"
Pinto from pintar, "to paint"; a white horse with a coat "painted" in large patterns of any other color.
piragua from Carib language
pisco from pisco, "turkey"
placer mining from placer, "sand bank" or "pleasure"
platinum from platina, "little silver" (now platino)
playa from playa, "beach" < latin plageaplaza from plaza, "public square, spot or place" < latin platea.
politico from Spanish or Italian político meaning "politician, political agent;" ultimately from Latin politicus meaning "of citizens or the state, civil, civic," from Greek πολιτικός (Ancient Greek: πολῑτικός) politikos, "of citizens or the state," from πολίτης (plural: πολίτες) polites (citizen) from πόλις polis, "city."
poncho from poncho, from Araucanian pontho meaning "woolen fabric." or "Short of Proper name Alfonso"
potato from Peninsular Spanish patata, itself from batata, "sweet potato", from Taíno and papa, "potato" from Quechua
potrero from potrero, archaic term for "tongue of land"
pronto from Spanish "soon, prompt"
pronunciamento from pronunciamiento proclamation, "military coup d'état", usually establishing a military dictatorship (often a junta)
puma from Spanish "cougar, panther", from Quechua
pueblo via Castilian pueblo from Latin populus ("people") or "Population of Country-side or outskirts".

 Q 
quadroon from cuarterón, "fourth"
quesadilla from quesadilla meaning a traditional Mexican dish made with tortillas and cheese, diminutive of queso, cheese.
quetzal from Spanish, from Nahuatl "quetzalli": a group of colourful birds of the trogon family found in tropical regions of the Americas. It also may refer to Guatemalan quetzal, the currency of Guatemala.
quinoa via Spanish quinua, from Quechua kinwaquinceañera from Spanish quince años, literally: "fifteen-year-old-girl"; a girl's fifteenth birthday celebration similar to a "sweet sixteen"; with special rituals in South America.
Quixotism/Quixotic from fictional character Don Quixote as in "tilting at windmills"
quirt from Spanish cuarta literally: "quarter"; a short horseman's whip, from "one fourth" (of a vara)

 R 
ranch from rancho, a very small rural community, smaller than a town; also a very humble dwelling in South American Spanish.
reconquista from reconquista, "reconquest"
remuda from Mexican Spanish remudar, to exchange (horses)
renegade from renegado, "turncoat, heretic, disowned"
rhumba from rumba synomyn of Big-Party
rincon from rincón, "meadow" or "corner-side"
robalo from Spanish róbalo meaning "bass, sea wolf," a tropical marine game and fish food
roble from Spanish roble, "oak tree" < latin roboris.
rodeo from rodeo and verb rodear (to go around) or "go-after and animal"
rumba from rumba or "farra" synomyn of Big-Party

 S 
saguaro from saguaro, from Piman
salsa from salsa, "sauce"
sapodilla from zapotillosarabande from French sarabande in turn from Spanish zarabandasavanna from sabana, "veld", from Taíno zabanasavvy from Spanish or Portuguese sabe, "knows"; sabio, "wise, learned" < latin sapidus "with sapience".
shack perhaps from Mexican Spanish jacal meaning "hut", from Nahuatl xacallisherry from Old Spanish Xerés , modern Spanish Jerez .
sierra from sierra, a mountain range
Sierra Nevada literally "snowy mountains"
siesta from siesta, "nap", from Latin Sexta [hora] "sixth hour"
silo from silosombrero from sombrero (literally, shade maker), "hat"
stampede from estampidastevedore from estibador (literally, one who stuffs), "ship loader"
stockade from a French derivation of the Spanish estocada, "stab"
suave meaning "charming, confident, and elegant" < latin suavis "sweet".

 T 
taco from taco, "plug" or from Portugues Battamale from Spanish tamales, pl. of tamal, from Nahuatl tamalli meaning dumpling made from corn flour
tango from Spanish tango.
tapioca from tapioca, "cassava"
ten-gallon hat from Spanish tan galán meaning "so gallant (looking)"; alternate theory is the gallon of Texas English here is a misunderstanding of galón meaning braid
temblor Spanish for trembling, or earthquake; from temblar, to shake, from Vulgar Latin *tremulāre, from Latin tremulustequila from tequila, from the town Tequila, where the beverage originated
telenovela or telenovella from telenovela, "soap opera" or to some extent "TV-drama-show"
tilde from tilde from Spanish ' symbol above some vowels
tobacco from Spanish (Nahuatl influenced) tabaco, "snuff"
tomatillo from Spanish tomatillo, "small tomato" (see Physalis philadelphica)
tomato from Spanish tomate, from Nahuatl xitomatltorero from toro, "bull"
tornado from Spanish tronada, "thunderstorm", influenced by tornar, "to turn"
tortilla from tortilla, literally "small cake". In Mexico is a type of thin flatbread made of finely ground wheat flour. Now is called "omelet" in Spain
tostada (toast) and tostada (tortilla) from tostada, "toasted"
tuna from Spanish atún, from Arabic تون tun, from Latin thunnus, from Greek θύννος, thynnos (=tuna fish)
turista from turista, "tourist" as either gender M/F

 V 
vamoose from vamos, meaning "let's go"
vanilla from Spanish vainilla, diminutive of Latin vaina, from vagina meaning "pod"
vaquero  from the Spanish word vaquerovertigo from the Spanish word vértigovicugna via Spanish, from Quechua wik'uñavigilante from Spanish vigilante, meaning "watchman." < latin vigiliā "sleepless night, vigil".

 W 
wop from Italian guappone, from Spanish guapo, "handsome" or "attractive".

 Y 
yerba buena from Spanish yerbabuena meaning "good herb" (infused in Tea which has a Mint smell) < latin erbam bonam Z 
Zorro from Spanish zorro'', a fox, originally "smart" (of Basque origin)

See also 

 List of Spanish words of Indigenous American Indian origin
 List of U.S. place names of Spanish origin
 List of English–Spanish interlingual homographs

References

External links 

Montague, Artur, El elemento español en el vocabulario inglés: prolegómenos a una lista. AIH. Actas IV (1971). (in Spanish)
Online Etymology Dictionary
List of English words of Spanish origin

Spanish